Sathirakondan is a village in Sankarankoil, Tenkasi district in the Indian state of Tamil Nadu.  This village is under the control of  Kuruvikulam block.

References
1.http://news.rediff.com/interview/2010/sep/08/interview-why-tamil-nadu-suspended-this-ias-officer.htm

External links

Villages in Tirunelveli district